The China-Mauritius refers to the bilateral relations between the island nation of the Republic of Mauritius and the People's Republic of China (PRC). A significant portion of the Mauritian population is of Chinese descent, known as Sino-Mauritians, having arrived on the island between the 17th and 19th centuries. Official diplomatic relations between the two countries were established on 15 April 1972 and, since then, relations between the two countries have been strong and have seen steady development. The Chinese President Hu Jintao visited Mauritius on 16 February 2009.

Chinese development finance to Mauritius
From 2000 to 2012, there are approximately 47 Chinese official development finance projects identified in Mauritius through various media reports. These projects range from funding a terminal at Sir Seewoosagur Ramgoolam international airport through a $260 million concessionary loan from the Export-Import Bank of China, to the renovation and repair of the Plaza Theatre in Rose-Hill through interest-free loans offered by the PRC.

See also

 Sino-Mauritian
 Overseas Chinese
 Africa–China relations
 Foreign relations of China
 Foreign relations of Mauritius

References

External links
 Embassy of the People's Republic of China in Mauritius
 Mauritius Embassy, Beijing

 
Mauritius
Bilateral relations of Mauritius